Riverside Methodist Church and Parsonage is a historic Methodist church and parsonage on Charles and Orchard Streets in Rhinecliff, Dutchess County in the U.S. state of New York. The church was built about 1859 and the parsonage about 1888.  The church is a small, two-story, rectangular stone building in the Gothic Revival style. It features a steeply pitched gable roof covered in polychrome slate. It has an open-frame bell tower and is built into the side of a hill.  The parsonage is a two-story, T-shaped frame dwelling topped by a cross-gable roof. Also on the property is a contributing garage.

It was added to the National Register of Historic Places in 1987.

References

Methodist churches in New York (state)
Churches on the National Register of Historic Places in New York (state)
Gothic Revival church buildings in New York (state)
Churches completed in 1859
19th-century Methodist church buildings in the United States
Churches in Dutchess County, New York
National Register of Historic Places in Dutchess County, New York